= Breaking the Deadlock =

American television series

Breaking the Deadlock is a television program that has aired on PBS since 2025. It features a panel of experts who consider and civilly debate hypothetical scenarios based on real events. It is hosted by Aaron Tang, a law professor at UC Davis.
